is a Japanese professional baseball pitcher. He was born on February 17, 1982, in Miyazaki, Japan. He is currently playing for the Saitama Seibu Lions of the NPB.

References

1982 births
Living people
Baseball people from Miyazaki Prefecture
North Shore Honu players
Japanese expatriate baseball players in the United States
Nippon Professional Baseball pitchers
Chiba Lotte Marines players
Hanshin Tigers players
Saitama Seibu Lions players